Mounkaïla Garike Idé Barkiré (born 19 January 1972), also known by his nickname Bappa, is a Nigerien former professional footballer who played as a striker. From 1992 to 1998, he scored seven goals in thirteen matches for the Niger national team.

Honours 
Sahel SC

 Ligue 1 (Niger): 1996

Africa Sports d'Abidjan

 Ligue 1 (Ivory Coast): 1999

References 

1972 births
Living people
Nigerien footballers
Association football forwards
Sahel SC players
Hutnik Nowa Huta players
Africa Sports d'Abidjan players
Super Ligue (Niger) players
Ekstraklasa players
Ligue 1 (Ivory Coast) players
Niger international footballers
Nigerien expatriate footballers
Expatriate footballers in Poland
Expatriate footballers in Ivory Coast
Nigerien expatriate sportspeople in Poland
Nigerien expatriate sportspeople in Ivory Coast